Canaan, also known as Hoods Mill, is an unincorporated community in Benton County, Mississippi, United States. A post office operated under the name Canaan from 1855 to 1984.

References

Unincorporated communities in Benton County, Mississippi
Unincorporated communities in Mississippi